Mary Harrison may refer to:
Mary Harrison (artist) (1788–1875), English flower and fruit painter, and illustrator
Mary Harrison (golfer), Irish golf champion
Mary Dimmick Harrison (1858–1948), wife of the 23rd President of the United States, Benjamin Harrison
Mary Harrison McKee (1858–1930), first lady to her father President Benjamin Harrison, when her mother, Caroline Harrison, was seriously ill and then died
Pricey Harrison (Mary Price Harrison, born 1958), American attorney and member of the North Carolina House of Representatives